Charles I de Créquy, Prince de Poix and Duc de Lesdiguières (1578–1638), was a leading French soldier of the first half of the 17th century.

Life

Charles de Créquy, ca. 1575 to 17 March 1638, was the only child of Antoine de Blanchefort (ca. 1545-1575), and Chrétienne d’Aguerre (1556-1611), Lady-in-waiting or dame d’honneur to Louise de Lorraine.

The de Créquy family were distributed throughout Northern France, with branches at Fressin, Bernieulles, Auffay and Heilly. They originated from Créquy, in Artois, which formed part of the French-speaking Southern Spanish Netherlands until annexed by France in 1659. Charles' father Antoine de Blanchefort inherited his titles and lands from his uncle, another Antoine (1531-1574), Roman Catholic Bishop of Amiens and advisor to Charles IX.

This background is significant in understanding their importance; Catholic loyalists from a disputed border province, in a period when France was divided by the Wars of Religion and threatened by the Spanish Empire, then the dominant power in Europe. Charles later married into the Lesdiguières family, Huguenots from the Dauphiné, which was then another border province.

In 1595, he married Madeleine de Bonne (1576-1621), daughter of François de Bonne, duc de Lesdiguières (1543-1626); they had four children, Françoise (1596-1656), Charles (1598-1630), François (1600–1677) and Madeleine (1609-1676). After his first wife's death in 1621, Charles married her half-sister Françoise de Bonne (1604-1647), ensuring his succession as duc de Lesdiguières when his father-in-law died in 1626.

Career
During the second half of the 16th century, France was divided by the 1562-1598 French Wars of Religion; in 1589, the Huguenot leader Henry of Navarre converted to Catholicism and was crowned Henry IV of France. The 1590 Edict of Nantes ended this phase of the civil war, although the Catholic League fought on for several years; Charles first saw action as a volunteer at the recapture of Laon by Henry in August 1594.

The long-running contest with Spanish and Austrian Habsburgs led to French involvement in the 1568-1648 Dutch Revolt and peripheral engagements of the 1618-48 Thirty Years War. During the 1627-1630 War of the Mantuan Succession, Charles' eldest son and namesake died in 1630 at Chambéry, the capital of Savoy and he himself was killed in 1638 at Breme in Lombardy.

Charles served under his father-in-law, the duc de Lesdiguières, in the 1600-1601 Franco-Savoyard War and was appointed Colonel of the Gardes Françaises in 1605. When Henry IV was assassinated in 1610, his son Louis XIII was only nine years old and his mother, Marie de Medici became Regent. Her concern at having the Protestant Lesdiguières as Governor of the Dauphiné led to his replacement in 1612 by Charles.

France regularly became involved in Italian disputes given its proximity to the Duchy of Savoy, which then included the modern French territories of Villefranche and the County of Savoy. In addition, control of Northern Italy allowed the Habsburgs to threaten the French provinces of Languedoc and the Dauphiné and control supply routes over the Alpine passes.

The capture of the Huguenot stronghold of La Rochelle in 1628 released French forces for the relief of Casale Monferrato, then besieged by a Habsburg army during the War of the Mantuan Succession. In March 1629, the French stormed barricades blocking the Pas de Suse and lift the siege of Casale; after agreeing the Treaty of Susa with Savoy in April, the French evacuated the area, leaving a garrison at the strategic fortress of Pinerolo.

Legacy

Some of his letters are preserved in the Bibliothque Nationale in Paris, and his life was written by Nicolas Chorier (Grenoble, 1683).

Notes

References

Sources
 
 ;
 ;
 
 ;

1578 births
1638 deaths
Marshals of France
Créquy family
Military personnel of the Franco-Spanish War (1635–1659)